Killing Fields is a cold case television series which premiered in 2016 on Discovery Channel.

About the Show

In 2016, the Discovery Channel began a series called "Killing Fields" about a cold case in Louisiana.  The show follows the investigators in real time as they try to solve the crime, which took place in June 1997.  This is the first true crime series developed by Discovery.  The show is executive produced by Barry Levinson and Tom Fontana among others.

The Crime

In June 1997 in Baton Rouge, Louisiana, Eugenie Boisfontaine disappeared.  Her body was found three months later in Bayou Manchac in nearby Iberville Parish, 15 miles south of Baton Rouge. Her head had blunt force trauma.  Was it a singular murder or from a string of serial murders in the area?  (There were 60 cases of missing and murdered women in the area during that time period and several serial murderers lived in nearby Baton Rouge.)

Detective Rodie Sanchez was the first investigator assigned to the case in 1997.  Because he could never stop thinking about it, he came out of retirement to try to solve the crime.  Detective Aubrey St. Angelo is a young detective who is helping Sanchez on the case.  His father worked with Sanchez for many years before he retired.  Both detectives are joined by many other detectives in the Iberville Parish Sheriff's office. Suspects during the investigation featured in the show were: Derrick Todd Lee, also known as the Baton Rouge Serial Killer, an unidentified male named Robert that Eugenie may have dated at the time of her murder and Michael Schmidt, her ex-husband.

Response

The series opened to strong numbers. On February 2, 2016, Discovery Channel ordered a minimum of 6 more episodes.

Episodes

Season 1 (2016)

Season 2 (2017)

References

External links
 Official Site
 IMDB

Discovery Channel original programming
2016 American television series debuts
2017 American television series endings
History of women in Louisiana